Huamangore (possibly from Quechua waman falcon, quri gold, "falcon gold") is a  mountain in the Chila mountain range in the Andes of Peru. It is located in the Arequipa Region, Castilla Province, on the border of the districts of Chachas and Orcopampa. Huamangore lies northwest of Huañacagua and Aceruta.

References

Mountains of Peru
Mountains of Arequipa Region